Bruno Kirby (born Bruno Giovanni Quidaciolu Jr.; April 28, 1949 – August 14, 2006) was an American actor. He was known for his roles in City Slickers, When Harry Met Sally..., Good Morning, Vietnam, The Godfather Part II, and Donnie Brasco. He voiced Reginald Stout in Stuart Little.

Early life 
Kirby was born in New York City on April 28, 1949. His father was actor Bruce Kirby (born Bruno Giovanni Quidaciolu). His brother John Kirby is an acting coach.

Kirby attended Power Memorial Academy.

Career 
Kirby was a character actor whose career spanned 35 years. In 1971 he made his screen debut in the drama The Young Graduates, although it was his role three years later as the young Peter Clemenza in epic crime film The Godfather Part II that raised his profile in Hollywood. In the summer of 1972, Kirby, in one of his early television appearances, portrayed Anthony Girelli, the son of Richard Castellano's character Joe Girelli, in The Super; Castellano had played the older Pete Clemenza in The Godfather.

His other television appearances included Room 222, and the pilot episode of M*A*S*H, portraying the character Boone (he had no lines). He also appeared in the 1974 Columbo episode "By Dawn's Early Light", alongside his father Bruce Kirby, and in the season 2 episode "Seance" of Emergency!, where he was credited as "B. Kirby Jr."

Described by Leonard Maltin as the "quintessential New Yorker or cranky straight man", Kirby appeared in a series of comedies, typically playing fast-talking, belligerent yet likable characters. His best known roles include a colleague of Albert Brooks' film editor in Modern Romance; a talkative limo driver in This Is Spinal Tap; the jealous, comedically impaired Lieutenant Hauk in Good Morning, Vietnam; and a shifty assistant to Marlon Brando—a parody of his Godfather role—in The Freshman. Kirby balanced comedies with dramatic roles like Donnie Brasco as a double-dealing mobster.

Kirby appeared with Billy Crystal in When Harry Met Sally... (1989) and City Slickers (1991). Both featured Kirby's character as the opinionated best friend to Crystal's character. Kirby refused to sign on for City Slickers II: The Legend of Curly's Gold unless script changes were made, and was subsequently replaced by Jon Lovitz.

In 1991, Kirby made his Broadway debut when he replaced Kevin Spacey in Neil Simon's Lost in Yonkers. In the last decade of his life, he had success in Stuart Little and was increasingly working in television. He starred as Barry Scheck in a 2000 CBS drama American Tragedy, played a paroled convict in a season three episode of Homicide: Life on the Street, and also directed an episode of that show.

He appeared on the HBO TV series Entourage in season 3, episode 4, "Guys and Doll", as movie mogul Phil Rubinstein.

He was invited to be a member of the Actors Studio in 2006, less than six months before his death.

Personal life and death 
Kirby, like his character in This is Spinal Tap, was a fan of Frank Sinatra. He enjoyed playing softball in the late 1970s. He was also strongly allergic to horses and needed daily allergy shots on the set of City Slickers (this was part of the reason he declined to return for City Slickers II: The Legend of Curly's Gold).

Kirby married Lynn Sellers on September 29, 2003. They remained married until his death in 2006.

He shared the same birthday, April 28, with his father, actor Bruce Kirby, who was born in 1925.

Kirby died on August 14, 2006, at age 57, from complications related to leukemia.

Filmography

Film

Television

Awards and nominations

References

External links 
 
 
 
 MSNBC article on Kirby's death
 Washington Post obituary

1949 births
2006 deaths
American male film actors
American male television actors
American male voice actors
American people of Italian descent
Deaths from cancer in California
Deaths from leukemia
Male actors from New York City
20th-century American male actors
21st-century American male actors